Johannes Cornelis "Hans" van Baalen (17 June 1960 – 29 April 2021) was a Dutch politician of the People's Party for Freedom and Democracy (VVD) who served as a Member of the European Parliament and Leader of the People's Party for Freedom and Democracy in the European Parliament from 2009 until 2019. He also was President of the Alliance of Liberals and Democrats for Europe Party from 21 November 2015 until his death.

Van Baalen, a jurist and management consultant by occupation, worked for Deloitte as Director of Public relations from his graduation in 1988 until 1999. He became a Member of the House of Representatives on 28 September 1999 serving until 23 May 2002. After the Dutch general election of 2003 he was re-elected as Member of the House of Representatives serving from 30 January 2003 until 14 July 2009 when he became Member of the European Parliament. Van Baalen served as President of the Liberal International from 20 April 2009 until 26 April 2014.

Early life and education
Johannes Cornelis van Baalen was born on 17 June 1960 in Rotterdam in the Netherlands.

He went to a public primary school in his hometown Krimpen aan den IJssel and to the high school Krimpenerwaard College in the same town, where he followed the havo (1973–1977) and atheneum (1977–1979) programs.

He studied Dutch law (1979–1986) and international law (1986–1988) at Leiden University. During these student years, he was a member of the Minerva fraternity and the 'Pro Patria' student guard.

Political career
Van Baalen was a member of the VVD since 1986. He was international secretary for the VVD party bureau from 1993 to 1998 and was an MP from 1999 until 2002. He was again made an MP in 2003. Before his political career he worked as a journalist and also with the public relations department of Deloitte Consulting. In the Dutch House of Representatives, van Baalen was a member of the Foreign Affairs commission, European Affairs commission and the Defense commission.

Beginning with the 2009 European elections, van Baalen was a member of European Parliament and faction leader of the Dutch VVD Delegation, and was generally seen as one of the most influential figures within the party. He served as a member of the Committee on Foreign Affairs and its Subcommittee on Security and Defence from 2009. On both committees, he was his parliamentary group’s coordinator. As substitute, he also served on the Committee on International Trade from 2014.

In addition to his committee assignments, van Baalen served as chairman of the parliament’s delegation relations with South Africa. He was previously a member of the delegations with Afghanistan (2010-2014), the United States (2010-2014) and Japan (2009-2014).

In July 2018, van Baalen announced that he would not stand in the 2019 European elections but instead resign by the end of the parliamentary term.

On 11 January 2021, the Dutch government appointed van Baalen as a member of the ‘Eminent Persons Group on the European Economy’ which advises Dutch politics on the EU economy, budgetary, fiscal & monetary policy.

On 19 March 2021, the Council of Ministers, on the proposal of the Minister of Foreign Affairs, agreed to nominate van Baalen for an appointment as a member of the Advisory Council on International Affairs (AIV).

Political positions

Relations with Russia and Ukraine
Van Baalen was a member of the European Parliament’s monitoring mission during the Ukrainian parliamentary elections in 2014, led by Andrej Plenković. With regard to the conflict with Russia over Ukraine, he argued for higher military spending and NATO involvement, and improved prospects for Ukraine to join the EU if its population so decided.

In 2015, news media reported that van Baalen was included in a Russian blacklist of prominent people from the European Union who are not allowed to enter the country.

In 2016 he received the Ukrainian Order of Merit Third Class, bestowed upon him by president Petro Poroshenko.

Car industry
Van Baalen worked until September 2015 as a lobbyist for the motoring organisation RAI and was on the supervisory board of Mercedes-Benz. Van Baalen reported those positions to the European Parliament and indicated he refrained from involvement in car-related parliamentary business. In 2014 however, van Baalen, in his capacity as member of European parliament called for standardized rules for the car industry in the European Union and the United States.

Distinctions
  Order of Merit (Ukraine), Third Class.
  Knight of the Order of Orange-Nassau

References

External links
Official

  Mr.Drs. J.C. (Hans) van Baalen Parlement.com
  Johannes Cornelis van Baalen Europees Parlement

|-

|-

1960 births
2021 deaths
20th-century Dutch journalists
20th-century Dutch jurists
20th-century Dutch politicians
21st-century Dutch jurists
21st-century Dutch politicians
Dutch colonels
Dutch corporate directors
Dutch lobbyists
Dutch management consultants
Dutch political consultants
Dutch public relations people
European Union lobbyists
Knights of the Order of Orange-Nassau
Leiden University alumni
Members of the House of Representatives (Netherlands)
MEPs for the Netherlands 2009–2014
MEPs for the Netherlands 2014–2019
People from Krimpen aan den IJssel
Politicians from Rotterdam
People's Party for Freedom and Democracy MEPs
People's Party for Freedom and Democracy politicians
Presidents of the Liberal International
Protestant Church Christians from the Netherlands
Recipients of the Order of Merit (Ukraine), 3rd class
Royal Netherlands Army officers
Military personnel from Rotterdam